Jean-Paul "J. P." Boulee (born January 31, 1971) is a United States district judge of the United States District Court for the Northern District of Georgia.

Education 

Boulee earned his Bachelor of Arts, magna cum laude, from Washington and Lee University, where he participated in Army Reserve Officers' Training Corps and was the Distinguished Military Graduate, and his Juris Doctor, cum laude, from the University of Georgia School of Law.

Legal career 

Upon graduation from law school, Boulee served as a law clerk to Judge Orinda Dale Evans of the United States District Court for the Northern District of Georgia. Boulee then served as a Captain in the United States Army Judge Advocate General's Corps, where he tried dozens of cases as both a prosecutor and defense attorney.

Boulee then became a partner in the Atlanta  office of Jones Day, where he was a member of the Corporate Criminal Investigations and Business and Tort Litigation practice groups, and worked there until becoming a state judge.

State court service 

Boulee served as a Judge of the Dekalb County Superior Court, where he founded the DeKalb County Veterans Treatment Court and is a member of the State Bar of Georgia's Judicial Procedure and Administration/Uniform Rules Committee. He was appointed to the court on May 12, 2015, by Governor Nathan Deal; he replaced Judge Cynthia J. Becker who retired in March 2015. His state court service ended in 2019 upon his elevation to the federal bench.

Federal judicial service 

On August 27, 2018, President Donald Trump announced his intent to nominate Boulee to serve as a United States district judge of the United States District Court for the Northern District of Georgia. Upon the announcement of his nomination, both Georgia Senators Johnny Isakson and David Perdue voiced their support. On August 28, 2018, his nomination was sent to the Senate. He was nominated to the seat vacated by Judge William S. Duffey Jr., who retired on July 1, 2018. On November 13, 2018, a hearing on his nomination was held before the Senate Judiciary Committee.

On January 3, 2019, his nomination was returned to the President under Rule XXXI, Paragraph 6 of the United States Senate. On January 23, 2019, President Trump announced his intent to renominate Boulee for a federal judgeship. His nomination was sent to the Senate later that day. On February 7, 2019, his nomination was reported out of committee by a 22–0 vote. On June 11, 2019, the Senate invoked cloture on his nomination by a 84–12 vote. On June 12, 2019, his nomination was confirmed by an  85–11 vote. He received his judicial commission on June 14, 2019.

Electoral history 
2016

References

External links 

|-

1971 births
Living people
20th-century American lawyers
21st-century American lawyers
21st-century American judges
Federalist Society members
Georgia (U.S. state) lawyers
Georgia (U.S. state) Republicans
Georgia (U.S. state) state court judges
Jones Day people
United States Army Judge Advocate General's Corps
Judges of the United States District Court for the Northern District of Georgia
People from Kankakee, Illinois
Public defenders
Superior court judges in the United States
United States Army officers
United States district court judges appointed by Donald Trump
University of Georgia School of Law alumni
Washington and Lee University alumni